Janice K. Langbehn (born September 22, 1968) is a gay American activist, social worker, and attorney who became an activist as a result of the events surrounding the death of her partner, Lisa Marie Pond (October 8, 1967 − February 19, 2007). Langbehn earned a Masters in Public Administration in 1995, a Masters in Social Work from the University of Washington in 2000, and a Juris Doctor from Seattle University in 2018.

Background story
In February 2007, Langbehn and Pond, along with three of their four children, were in Miami, FL to depart on a cruise. Pond collapsed before the cruise departed and was rushed to Jackson Memorial Hospital's (JMH) Ryder Trauma Center. When Langbehn and their children arrived, a JMH social worker told Langbehn she was in an "anti-gay city and state" and required a health care proxy to see Pond. Langbehn had a power of attorney (POA) which was faxed to the hospital within an hour of Pond's arrival. However, Langbehn and their 3 young children were kept from Pond's side for eight hours. Pond slipped into a coma from a brain aneurysm and died without her partner of 18 years or her children by her side.

Federal lawsuit
When Langbehn unsuccessfully sought an apology from the hospital, she turned to  Lambda Legal Defense Fund. Lambda Legal filed suit against Jackson Memorial on June 25, 2008, in the Federal District Court of  Miami, FL.

Lawsuit dismissed
Florida Federal District Court Judge Jordan wrote in his Order to Dismiss,

Media
Langbehn was asked to speak publicly about her partner's death for the first time at the Olympia, WA Pride gathering on June 18, 2007, four months after Pond's death.  As the family's story caught national attention they were featured in the New York Times by writer Tara Parker-Pope. As a result of the article, White House chief of staff Rahm Emanuel brought the article to the attention of President Barack Obama.  On April 15, 2010, President Obama called Langbehn from Air Force One to apologize for the treatment her family received at Jackson Memorial Hospital and to inform her about the Presidential Memorandum he signed earlier that day. President Obama's Memorandum directed the Secretary of Health and Human Services, Kathleen Sebelius to create a rule allowing hospital visitations for same-sex couples comparable to those of married and opposite sex couples.  Following Langbehn's phone call with President Obama, she spoke live to CNN news anchor Anderson Cooper on the show Anderson Cooper 360°.

Committee for Fair Visitation at Jackson Memorial Hospital
As a result of the ongoing media attention the "Committee for Fair Visitation at Jackson Memorial Hospital" negotiated changes with the hospital regarding same-sex visitation.  The committee consisted of partners throughout the LGBT Community including Lambda Legal, Human Rights Campaign (HRC), and Gay and Lesbian Medical Association (GLMA) among others. On April 13, 2010, Jackson Memorial Hospital in conjunction with the Committee announced significant changes to visitation policies regarding LGBT patients. In addition to the changes at Jackson Memorial Hospital, the Joint Commission (formerly the Joint Commission on Accreditation of Hospital Organizations - JCAHO), published new guidelines addressing inclusion of LGBT patient and families in hospital visitation.

Healthcare Equality Index
In 2007 the Human Rights Campaign published a report entitled the "Healthcare Equality Index" which examined equality of care in US hospitals. In 2010, the HEI reported indicated progress, crediting the Langbehn-Pond story for bringing the issue of hospital visitation for same-sex couples into the public eye.  The proposed rule for "Fair Visitation" was issued in November 2010.  Over 1,250 public comments were received during the open comment period.  In 2010, the Human Rights Campaign published the fourth edition of the Healthcare Equality Index, assessing America's hospitals in their inclusiveness for treating LGBT families and individuals. This report was dedicated to the memory of Langbehn's partner, Lisa Marie Pond.

White House pride celebration
On June 22, 2010, Langbehn and her three children met with Secretary Sebelius and then attended a gay pride reception at the White House. Prior to the reception, President Obama met with Langbehn and the children to again offer his apology. While speaking at the reception, President Obama described the struggles the Langbehn-Pond family faced and the impact of his memorandum. The President said, "Just a few moments ago, I met with Janice Langbehn and her children ... And when Janice's partner of 18 years, Lisa, suddenly collapsed because of an aneurysm, Janice and the couple's three kids were denied the chance to comfort their partner and their mom -- barred from Lisa's bedside. It was wrong. It was cruel. And in part because of their story, I instructed my Secretary of Health and Human Services, Kathleen Sebelius, to make sure that any hospital that's participating in Medicare or Medicaid -- that means most hospitals -- (laughter) -- allow gay and lesbian partners the same privileges and visitation rights as straight partners."

Recognition and awards

In 2010, Langbehn was awarded the Olympia, WA "Capital City Pride Award for 2010".  On September 25, 2010, Langbehn was awarded the National Equality Award by the Human Rights Campaign for her continued fight for equality in hospital visitation. Langbehn continues to speak for the need of equality for LGBT families and impressing upon her audiences that "holding Lisa's hand was not a gay right but a human right." Notable editor of the Windy City Times, Tracy Baim, wrote about the Langbehn-Pond family in her recently published book, Obama and the Gays: A Political Marriage. Also in 2010, the Human Rights Campaign  published a Health Care Equality Index assessing America's hospitals in their inclusiveness for treating LGBT families and individuals. This report was dedicated to the memory of Langbehn's partner, Lisa Marie Pond.  Lambda Legal presented Langbehn with their Liberty award in New York City on May 2, 2011.

Presidential Citizens Medal
On October 20, 2011, President Barack Obama awarded Langbehn with the second highest civilian honor: the Presidential Citizens Medal. Langbehn was one of 13 recipients for 2011.  Langbehn's citation read

Public policy change
The hospital visitation rule requiring all hospital receiving Medicare and Medicaid funding to allow for LGBT family visitation went into effect January 18, 2011.

A short film, Quiet, a fictionalized version of Lisa's death is receiving awards and showing at Academy Award qualify festivals.  The film is dedicated to the memory of Lisa Pond and how her death catapulted LGBT hospital visitation to the forefront of publicly policy.

Langbehn resides in Lacey, WA raising the children that Pond and she adopted from the Washington State foster care program.

Lisa Marie Pond

Langbehn's partner of 18 years, Lisa Marie Pond, collapsed on February 18, 2007 after a fatal brain aneurysm. She was 39 years old. Arriving at Ryder Trauma Center,  Jackson Memorial Hospital in Miami, Langbehn was barred from seeing Pond. Langbehn could not see Pond or receive information about her health status. Langbehn contacted friends in their hometown, Lacey, WA and the required documents were faxed to the hospital. Pond died the following morning at 10:45am EST and per her wishes outlined in her Living Will her organs were donated saving four lives.  Pond's partner and children participated in the Tournament of Roses Parade on January 2, 2012 celebrating Pond's organ donations.

References

Further reading

 James, Susan Donaldson (2010). Obama Orders Hospitals to Allow Gay Visitation, Medical Rights. ABC News.
 Wright, Todd. Miami Story Inspires Obama to Change Hospital Policy on Gays. NBC News, Miami.
 Obama hosts White House LGBT reception. United Press International, 2010.

1968 births
Living people
American LGBT rights activists
American LGBT people
Presidential Citizens Medal recipients
People from Lacey, Washington
Lesbians